Computer speakers, or multimedia speakers, are speakers sold for use with computers, although usually capable of other audio uses, e.g. for an MP3 player. Most such speakers have an internal amplifier and consequently require a power source, which may be by a mains power supply often via an AC adapter, batteries, or a USB port. The signal input connector is often a 3.5 mm jack plug (usually color-coded lime green per the PC 99 standard); RCA connectors are sometimes used, and a USB port may supply both signal and power (requiring additional circuitry, and only suitable for use with a computer). Battery-powered wireless Bluetooth speakers require no connections at all. Most computers have speakers of low power and quality built in; when external speakers are connected they disable the built-in speakers. Altec Lansing claims to have created the computer speaker market in 1990.

Computer speakers range widely in quality and in price.  Computer speakers sometimes packaged with computer systems are small, plastic, and have mediocre sound quality. Some computer speakers have equalization features such as bass and treble controls. Bluetooth speakers can be connected with a computer by using an Aux jack and compatible adaptor.

More sophisticated computer speakers can have a subwoofer unit to enhance bass output. The larger subwoofer enclosure usually contains the amplifiers for the subwoofer and the left and right speakers.

Some computer displays have rather basic speakers built-in. Laptop computers have built-in integrated speakers, usually small and of restricted sound quality to conserve space.

See also
 PC speaker
 Loudspeaker enclosure

References

American inventions
Computer peripherals
Loudspeakers
Boombox culture

tl:Speaker